Haren is a village in the municipality of Oss in the province of North Brabant, Netherlands.

The village was first mentioned in 1191 as "Egenus de Haren", and means "sandy ridge".

The chapel of the monastery of the Sisters of St. Francis was built in 1520. The monastery is surrounded by a moat and was buildings from the 17th century. The Catholic St Lambertus Church was built between 1867 and 1868 in Gothic Revival style.

Haren was home to 485 people in 1840. Before it became a part of the municipality Oss in 1994, Haren was a municipality together with Macharen and Megen.

Gallery

References 

Populated places in North Brabant
Oss